Weather Information Network was a Filipino weather and public information satellite television channel based in Makati. It is owned and operated by MediaQuest Holdings, Inc., a wholly owned subsidiary of the PLDT Beneficial Trust Fund through TV5. With partnership of New Zealand-based Metra Weather, the channel will bring projected storm tracks, wind direction, rain volume, water conditions, regional and provincial weather, and seven-day forecasts as well as other information related to weather.

TV5 earlier teams up with Metra since 2010 to bring advanced computer-based weather visualization system, locally known as Aksyon Weather Center, making the station's weather forecasts ahead of its competitors and recognized by agencies such as PAGASA.

It was announced that Weather Information Network will be ceased broadcast effective by December 23, 2013, as TV5 transfers its broadcast facilities from its TV5 Studio Complex in Novaliches, Quezon City to TV5 Media Center in Reliance, Mandaluyong.

External links
 Live Stream

References 

TV5 Network channels
Defunct television networks in the Philippines
Television channels and stations established in 2012
Television channels and stations disestablished in 2013
Companies based in Makati
Weather television networks